Pachypodium densiflorum is a species of flowering plant in the Apocynaceae family. It is native to Madagascar. In habitat, it grows on granite rocks in the central plateau of Madagascar.

Description
Pachypodium densiflorum grows from a sizeable, fleshy basal caudex. Shoots growing from the caudex are regularly branched and spiny at the youngest parts. Leaves appear at the top of these shoots during vegetation periods and are lanceolate and deep green. The flowers are yellow and appear on long peduncles.

References

The Complete Encyclopedia of Succulents by Zdenek Jezek and Libor Kunte

densiflorum
Caudiciform plants
Taxa named by John Gilbert Baker